Perigracilia is a genus of beetles in the family Cerambycidae, containing the following species:

 Perigracilia delicata Knull, 1942
Perigracilia exigua (Zayas, 1975)
 Perigracilia tenuis Linsley, 1942

References

Graciliini